Panhumanism is the concept of an affiliation with all humankind through some sort of legislative structure that allows all technological and economic development to be for the benefit of all people. The concept is sometimes seen as far-left, although there are also right-wing and centrist pan-human organisations, including the United Nations, some of which have even received significant opposition from the far-left over globalisation policies.

History
Humanism originates in the European Renaissance, especially the Italian Renaissance, although the word was not coined until the early nineteenth century. Rather than an ideology, it was a cultural frame of ideas with a non-absolutistic approach to any truth. It emphasized the uniqueness of the individual and often claimed a connection between man and nature.

At the core of Renaissance humanism was the concept of humanitas, which meant the development of human virtue to its fullest extent. The possessor of humanitas could not be merely a sedentary and isolated philosopher or man of letters but was of necessity a participant in active life. Just as action without insight was held to be aimless and barbaric, insight without action was rejected as barren and imperfect. Humanitas scholars also believed it was inevitable to project humanitas from the individual into the state at large.

Interpretations

Carl Sagan 

Carl Sagan's ideas have attracted criticism. Some argue that the trend is in fact not in that direction, as part of the reason why we evolve is in order to continually face a greater enemy. Therefore, without an enemy that places the whole of humankind on the other side, panhumanism is not possible.

Marxism 

A communist society or communist system is the type of society and economic system postulated to emerge from technological advances in the productive forces in Marxist thought, representing the ultimate goal of the political ideology of Communism. A communist society is characterized by common ownership of the means of production with free access to the articles of consumption and is classless and stateless, implying the end of the exploitation of labor. In his Critique of the Gotha Programme Karl Marx referred to this stage of development as upper-stage communism.

World Government 
World government is the notion of a common political authority for all of humanity, yielding a global government and a single state. Such a government could come into existence either through violent and compulsory world domination or through peaceful and voluntary supranational union. Currently there is no worldwide executive, legislature, judiciary, military, or constitution with jurisdiction over the entire planet. The United Nations is limited to a mostly advisory role, and its stated purpose is to foster cooperation between existing national governments rather than exert authority over them.

A United Nations Parliamentary Assembly (UNPA) is a proposed addition to the United Nations System that would allow for participation of member nations' legislators and, eventually, direct election of United Nations (UN) parliament members by citizens worldwide. The idea was raised at the founding of the League of Nations in the 1920s and again following the end of World War II in 1945, but remained dormant throughout the Cold War. In the 1990s and 2000s, the rise of global trade and the power of world organizations that govern it led to calls for a parliamentary assembly to scrutinize their activity. The Campaign for the Establishment of a United Nations Parliamentary Assembly was formed in 2007 to coordinate pro-UNPA efforts, which as of July 2013 has received the support of over 850 Members of Parliament from over 90 countries worldwide, in addition to over 350 non-governmental organizations and 21 Nobel and Right Livelihood laureates and 16 Heads or former heads of state or government and foreign ministers.

See also 
 Globalization - The desire to interconnect and share ideas between cultures and nations
 Transhumanism - The idea of developing human capabilities as a species
 Stateless communism – A communist realisation of a pan-human state
 Postnationalism - The idea of devolving powers to supranational entities
 Global citizenship - The belief that one is a member of Earth, rather than of a nation or other entity

References 

Humanism